Elisabetta Belloni (born 1 September 1958) is an Italian diplomat and civil servant, Director of the Department of Information for Security since 2021.

Biography 
Graduated in Political Science at Luiss University in 1982 with a thesis on international negotiation techniques, Belloni embarked on a diplomatic career in 1985. She has held positions in Italian embassies and representations permanent offices in Vienna and Bratislava, as well as in the Directorates General of the Ministry of Foreign Affairs. In particular, from 1993 to 1996 she was First Secretary of the Italian diplomatic representation to international organizations. After returning to Rome, she worked briefly in the Russia Office before being promoted in 2000 to the secretariat of the Directorate for European Countries. In 2001 she was appointed Head of the Office for Central and Eastern European Countries and finally, since 2002, Head of the Secretariat of the Undersecretary of State for Foreign Affairs Roberto Antonione.

From November 2004 to June 2008, she directed the Crisis Unit of the Ministry of Foreign Affairs. She was director-general of development cooperation from 2008 to 2013, while from January 2013 to June 2015 she was director-general for resources and innovation.

In February 2014, she was promoted to rank ambassador; since June 2015, she has held the position of  Chief of Staff of the Minister of Foreign Affairs Paolo Gentiloni. Following the resignation from the diplomatic career of Ambassador Michele Valensise, then Secretary-General of the Farnesina, in April 2016 she was appointed Secretary-General of the Ministry of Foreign Affairs and took office on 5 May. She has been professor of Development Cooperation at the Luiss Guido Carli.

In May 2018, her name was presented by the press, together with the economist Lucrezia Reichlin, as a possible candidate to receive the mandate of Prime Minister of the 18th legislature.

She left the Ministry on 12 May 2021, being appointed by Prime Minister Mario Draghi as Director of the Department of Information for Security.

Honours 
 Order of Merit of the Italian Republic 1st Class / Knight Grand Cross – 1 June 2017

References 

|-

1958 births
Living people
Diplomats from Rome
20th-century diplomats
21st-century diplomats
Italian diplomats
Italian women ambassadors
Knights Grand Cross of the Order of Merit of the Italian Republic
Libera Università Internazionale degli Studi Sociali Guido Carli alumni